Summer Festival may refer to:

Summer Festival (TV series)
Ann Arbor Summer Festival
Dubrovnik Summer Festival
Ljubljana Summer Festival
Ohrid Summer Festival
Quebec City Summer Festival
Skopje Summer Festival
Summer Festival, Albania
Summer Sonic Festival
Tokyo Summer Festival